Korea's Got Talent is a South Korean reality television show that was first broadcast on 4 June 2011 on tvN. The show is based on the Got Talent series format, originating with Britain's Got Talent. This is the show's first series in Korea. The judges are Kolleen Park, Jang Jin and Song Yun-ah.

The show started accepting applicants on 9 February 2011 via ARS, the official website, and smart phone apps. The show held regional auditions nationwide starting in Busan on 2 April 2011.

The show became famous around the world after a video of Choi Sung-bong's appearance gained worldwide media attention.

For prizes, the semi-finalists will have the opportunity to sign with Sony Music, and the winner will receive US$100,000.

Seasons

Season 1 (2011)

Season 2 (2012)

Notes

References 

 
Television series by Fremantle (company)
TVN (South Korean TV channel) original programming
2011 South Korean television series debuts
2011 South Korean television series endings
South Korean television series based on British television series
Music competitions in South Korea